Daniel Brands was the champion in 2008.
Victor Hănescu won the title, defeating Guillaume Rufin 6–0, 6–3 in the final.

Seeds

Draw

Finals

Top half

Bottom half

References
 Main Draw
 Qualifying Draw

BRD Timisoara Challenger - Singles
2012 Singles